The Norwegian National Academy of Arts is a Norwegian Academy offering studies in the area of Fine Art. The Academy currently offers 3-year bachelor  and 2-year MA programmes. The "Norwegian National Academy of the Arts" is still referred to simply as Kunstakademiet or the Art Academy amongst both Staff and students.

History
The Art Academy was formerly National Academy of Art (Statens Kunstakademi), an autonomous art academy formed in 1909. The noted Norwegian painter Christian Krogh was one of three professors at the Academy of Art when it was established. The staff additionally included painter Halfdan Strøm and the sculptor Gunnar Utsond (1864–1950).

The Academy was initially organized along the lines of the old master studios. The Academy moved to better premises in the Merchant Building on Drammensveien in central Oslo during  1919 and special drawing office at the rear of the Kunstnernes Hus in 1930. In 1935, the Danish painter and architect Georg Jacobsen came to the Academy. From 1935 to 1940, he worked  in an extraordinary professorship in art construction and composition teaching. In 1941, the collaborationist Quisling regime called for new arrangements of the academy and added painter and Nasjonal Samling party member Søren Onsager as a professor.

In the mid-1990s the academy merged with the formerly independent Design, Craft, Stage Arts, and Opera academies to form the Oslo National Academy of Art (Kunsthøgskole i Oslo), the nation's largest arts college. The former Kunstakademiet then became the Faculty of Visual Arts within the KhiO administration organisation.

In August 2010 all the schools physically merged into a new building in a former sail factory in Grünerløkka on the east side of Oslo. Forming one of the largest art academies in Europe. The Kunstakademi has its own semi-autonomous power of operations, its own quarters and studios as well as its own academic and admissions programs.

References

External links
Oslo National Academy of the Arts

Fine Arts
Fine Arts
Educational institutions established in 1909
Educational institutions disestablished in 1996
1909 establishments in Norway